is a Japanese professional golfer. She won 62 tournaments internationally, including 17 on the U.S.-based LPGA Tour. She is a member of the World Golf Hall of Fame.

Early career
Okamoto was born in Akitsu, Hiroshima, now part of Higashihiroshima, Hiroshima, Japan. In her youth and early 20s she was a softball player. She was the star pitcher on the Japanese national champion in 1971. Her club team was owned by the textile company Daiwabo, where Okamoto worked. The company owned a golf facility next door, and when she was 22, Okamoto finally decided to start playing. Although she pitched left-handed, she learned golf right-handed. She would join the LPGA of Japan Tour in 1973. Just three years later, at age 25, she won the Mizuno Corporation Tournament. In 1979 (at age 28) Okamoto won the Japan LPGA Championship, and in 1981 she won eight times in Japan and topped the LPGA of Japan money list.

LPGA career
Okamoto was a superstar in Japan, but she decided to branch out and joined the American LPGA Tour in 1981. From 1982 through 1992, Okamoto won 17 times, her first coming at the 1982 Arizona Copper Classic. Okamoto was a consistent winner on the LPGA Tour, claiming four wins in 1987 (plus four runners-up and 17 top-10s) and three wins each in 1984 and 1988. In 1987, she led the tour's money list and earned the LPGA Tour Player of the Year award, the first non-American to do either.

The only thing Okamoto did not do in the United States was win a major. She finished as runner-up six times in major championships. Her best opportunities came in 1986, when she lost a sudden death playoff to Pat Bradley at the du Maurier Classic and in 1987 when she lost  an 18-hole playoff to Laura Davies for the U.S. Women's Open crown (JoAnne Carner was also in the playoff). She was in the top-10 at the Open every year from 1983 to 1987, and in the top-10 at the LPGA Championship every year from 1984 to 1991.

Okamoto's last LPGA victory was in 1992, and 1993 was her last year to play a full or half schedule in the U.S.  Okamoto returned to Japan after 1993, where she played until 2005. In addition to her 17 LPGA wins, Okamoto also won 44 times on the LPGA of Japan Tour, and twice on the Ladies European Tour. She was voted into the World Golf Hall of Fame on the International ballot and entered in 2005.

Professional wins (62)

LPGA Tour wins (17)

Note: Okamoto won the Hitachi Ladies British Open (now known as the Women's British Open) before it became a major championship.

LPGA Tour playoff record (2–4)

LPGA majors are shown in bold.

LPGA of Japan Tour wins (44)
1975 (1) Mizuno Golf
1976 (1) All-Star
1977 (4) World Ladies, Tohoku Queens, Asahi Toys, Japan Ladies Professional East vs. West
1978 (1) KTV Ladies Classic
1979 (2) Japan LPGA Championship, Tokai Classic
1980 (3) Kumamoto Chuo Ladies, Hokuriku Queens, Saikai National Park Ladies Open
1981 (8) Sanin Ladies Golf, KBS Ladies, Fuji Ladies Classic, Hokuriku Queens, Stanley Ladies, Japan Ladies Professional East vs West, Miyagi TV Women's Open, Sanyo Queens
1982 (4) Tohato Ladies, Dunlop Ladies, Japan LPGA Championship, Tokai Classic
1983 (1) Sanyo Queens
1984 (1) Tsumura Itsuki Classic
1986 (1) Nichirei Ladies Cup
1987 (1) Konica Cup
1989 (2) Tokai Classic, Itoki Classic
1990 (1) Japan LPGA Championship
1991 (3) Yamaha Cup Ladies, Karuizawa 72 Tokyu Ladies Open, Kosaido Asahi Cup
1992 (2) Tohato Ladies, Fujisankei Ladies Classic
1993 (2) Japan Women's Open Golf Championship, Itoen Ladies
1994 (3) Tohato Ladies, Itoki Classic, Kosaido Asahi Cup
1996 (1) Fujisankei Ladies Classic
1997 (1) Japan Women's Open Golf Championship
1999 (1) Katokichi Queens

Tournament in bold denotes major championships on LPGA of Japan Tour.

Ladies European Tour wins (2)
1984 (1) Hitachi Ladies British Open (co-sanctioned by the LPGA Tour)
1990 (1) Lufthansa Ladies' German Open

Results in LPGA Majors

CUT = missed the half-way cut.
WD = withdrew
"T" = tied

Summary
Starts – 52
Wins – 0
2nd-place finishes – 6
3rd-place finishes – 4
Top 3 finishes – 10
Top 5 finishes – 12
Top 10 finishes – 21
Top 25 finishes – 30
Missed cuts – 4
Most consecutive cuts made – 24
Longest streak of top-10s – 7

See also
List of golfers with most LPGA Tour wins

External links
 

Ayako Okamoto bio at golfcompendium.com

Japanese female golfers
LPGA Tour golfers
LPGA of Japan Tour golfers
World Golf Hall of Fame inductees
Sportspeople from Hiroshima Prefecture
1951 births
Living people